Odesa Portside Plant is a chemical-industrial enterprise in Odesa Oblast, Ukraine. The chemical plant is located on the shores of the Small Adzhalyk Estuary and is situated next to Pivdennyi Port through which chemical cargo is transshipped. The key stake belongs to Group DF. 

In May 2022, the plant was shelled by Russians missiles.

Gallery

See also
DniproAzot

References

Companies established in 1974
Chemical companies of Ukraine
Odesa Oblast
Companies based in Odesa Oblast